Southside High School is a 5A public high school in the Southside Independent School District of San Antonio, Texas (United States). Southside High School serves the far south side of the city of San Antonio. In 2015, the school was rated "Met Standard" by the Texas Education Agency.

Athletics
The Southside Cardinals compete in the following sports:

Baseball
Basketball
Cross Country
Football
Golf
Powerlifting
Soccer
Softball
Track and Field
Volleyball

The golf team have won consecutive district titles. The boys won in 1997, 1998, 1999, 2000, 2002, 2005, 2006, 2007, 2008, 2011, and 2012. The girls won in 1999, 2000, 2001, 2002, 2003, 2004, 2005, 2006, 2007, 2008, 2010, 2011, 2012, and 2013.

Activities

Band
The Southside marching band, also known as the Mighty Cardinal Band, has around 100 members. It was also one of the featured bands for Battle of the Bands 2014 for its 2013-2014 show "Conquistador".

References

External links 
Southside ISD

Educational institutions established in 1950
High schools in San Antonio
Public high schools in Bexar County, Texas
1950 establishments in Texas